Kashtanove is a rural settlement in Yasynuvata Raion (district) in Donetsk Oblast of eastern Ukraine, at 16.2 km NNE from the centre of Donetsk city.

The settlement was taken under control of pro-Russian forces during the War in Donbass, that started in 2014.

Demographics
In 2001 the settlement had 58 inhabitants. Native language distribution as of the Ukrainian Census of 2001:
Ukrainian: 36.21%
Russian: 63.79%

References

Rural settlements in Donetsk Oblast